Leskovac Airport may refer to any of these airports serving Leskovac, Serbia:

 Mira Airport
 Bojnik Airport